HotSauce (code-named Project X) was experimental software developed by Apple Computer as a sample application of its Meta Content Framework. HotSauce generated a 3D visualization of the contents of an MCF file, for example, a website sitemap. It could also be used to navigate the contents of the user's hard drive.

Apple offered beta versions of HotSauce as a web browser plug-in for the classic Mac OS and Microsoft Windows and a stand-alone application.

HotSauce was never released in a final version and while MCF was adopted by thousands of websites, including Yahoo!, most users saw no point in navigating them in a 3D space. The project was discontinued along with MCF shortly after Steve Jobs' return to the company in 1997.

References

External links
The Meta-Content Format/Framework – HotSauce and MCF nostalgia site, with articles and the original HotSauce software available for download.
A Brief History of Data Syndication and Podcasting

Apple Inc. software
Data visualization software